Diana Beauclerk may refer to:

 Diana Beauclerk, Duchess of St Albans (1679–1742), British courtier
 Lady Diana Beauclerk (1734–1808), English noblewoman and artist